Tom Hutton may refer to:

Tom Hutton (American football) (born 1972), former football player
Tommy Hutton (born 1946), former baseball player and current announcer

See also
Thomas Jacomb Hutton (1890–1981), British general
Thomas Hutton (priest), Canon of Windsor, 1485–1487